Elisenhøy is a neighbourhood in the city of Kristiansand in Agder county, Norway. It is located in the borough of Grim and in the district of Grim. It is located on the south side of the Norwegian National Road 9, east of Klappane and Grim torv, northwest of Fagervoll, and south of Krossen.

References

Geography of Kristiansand
Neighbourhoods of Kristiansand